USS Charleston (AKA-113/LKA-113) was an amphibious cargo ship, and was the lead ship of her class in the United States Navy. She was the fifth ship to be named Charleston for Charleston, South Carolina. She served as a commissioned ship for 23 years and 4 months.

She was laid down as AKA-113 at Newport News Shipbuilding and Dry Dock Co., Newport News, Virginia, and was launched on 2 December 1967. She was commissioned on 14 December 1968, and was redesignated as LKA-113 on 1 January 1969.

Charleston was involved in the Vietnam War, and earned eight awards and campaign ribbons for her service.

Decommissioned 1992, she was mothballed at Portsmouth, Virginia. She is berthed at the Naval Inactive Ship Maintenance Facility in Philadelphia, Pennsylvania, awaiting disposal.

There is no DANFS entry for the ship.

In popular culture
In the Tom Clancy novel Red Storm Rising, The Charleston is sunk by an AS-4 missile launched by a Badger bomber while part of an amphibious group involved in the recovery of Iceland from a Soviet invasion.

External links

NavSource Online: AKA / LKA-113 Charleston
Military.com: USS Charleston
51 Years of AKAs

 

Charleston-class amphibious cargo ships
Cold War amphibious warfare vessels of the United States
Vietnam War amphibious warfare vessels of the United States
Charleston, South Carolina
1967 ships
Ships built in Newport News, Virginia